Apparent may refer to:

Apparent magnitude, a measure of brightness of a celestial body as seen by an observer on Earth
Apparent places, the actual coordinates of stars as seen from Earth 
Heir apparent, a person who is first in line of succession
Apparent death, an antipredator behavior known as playing dead
Apparent wind, a wind experienced by a moving object
Eire Apparent, a band from Northern Ireland
Apparent authority (or ostensible authority) relates to the doctrines of the law of agency.